Manamadurai is a Municipality Town  in Sivaganga district in the Indian state of Tamil Nadu. Manamadurai falls under Manamadurai Legislative assembly.

Upgradation of Manamadurai to Municipality 
Municipal Administration Minister KN Nehru made the announcement issuing an ordinance to form Manamadurai Union panchayat as Manamadurai Municipality on 16 October 2021.

Geography
The Vaigai river flows from north to south through Manamadurai and divides the town into Eastern bank and Western bank. The town cover an area of revenue villages Arimandapam, Keelamelkudi, Vethiyanenthal, Kalkurichi, Udaikulam, Thayapuram, Sipcot, Seikalathur, Othakadai, Moongilurani, Kannar street, Alagar Kovil street, Brinthavanam, Railway colony, Krishnarajapuram colony, Ramnagar, Mangulam, seiyaalur, Kombukaranenthal, Pattatharechi, Pattar street, Valanaadu, Kalpiravu, Panikaranenthal, Athanoor, Keelapasalai, Melapasalai, New Vasantha Nagar, Rajakambeeram, Keppanoor, Sangamangalam, Annavasal, comes under limit of the town.

Demographics
 India census, Manamadurai had a population of 50,500. Males constitute 50% of the population and Females 50%. Manamadurai has an average literacy rate of 77% : Male literacy is 82%, and female literacy is 72%. In Manamadurai, 10% of the population is under six years of age. The town has 20,406 households.

Manamadurai falls under Manamadurai State assembly constituency and Sivaganga Loksabha constituency.

Highlights 
This town is famous for manufacturing Ghatam musical instruments, clay pots, clay horses, and other clay items.

Festivals
 The 'Chithirai Thiruvizha' festival is celebrated every year in the Tamil month Chithirai for 13 days.
 The annual urus (Santhanakoodu) festival marking the martyrdom day of the Panch shuhadas is commemorated on the 17th of the Islamic month of Jamadil Awwal every Hijri year.

Industry
The State Industries Promotion Corporation of Tamil Nadu (SIPCOT) Limited is situated in Sivagangai road, which is a major employment source for people in and around Manamadurai. This SIPCOT has the potential to turn in to a graphite mineral based industrial hub because huge amount of Graphite ore is process by Government owned factory at Sivagangai which is near to this SIPCOT only.

Manamadurai was famous for its production of jasmine flowers. This industry has dwindled over time due to the destruction of gardens throughout the town. Bricks, brick tiles, and pot-making centres are major industries in Manamadurai.

Videocon manufacturing unit 
SIPCOT has allocated  of land near Manamadurai to the Indian electronics company Videocon to set up its manufacturing facility for refrigerators, washing machines, and television sets. The company had plans to introduce a battery assembly line at this facility.

Small scale industries

The Manamadurai town has numerous small scale industries.

Jothi idly/dosa Batters Ltd. Is a leading turn over industry in Manamadurai which serves the whole town at morning and evening for its dosa batter. Manamadurai has many departmental stores. Thirumurugan Super Mart, A1 super market, Saravana stores and Sashwanth super market, Balagurusamy stores, Gangai stores.

It is a major turn over hub of brickings and blockings industries. There are many bricks, paver and hollow blocks, and tile manufacturing units in Manamadurai. Seeniappa tile works, Sri periyandavar Brick works, Chitra tile works.the leading timber trading hubs are Akila timbers, Periyandavar timbers and plywoods, Seeniappa timbers, Sudha timbers, balamurugan hardwares and Marketing stores etc.

SIPCOT industries

The sipcot Manamadurai has many small scale industries which include 
1.Sirius Zip fastners(Zip manuf.)
2.Balakrishna Chemicals(calcium carbide manuf.)
3.Bhuvana Polymers and Plastics Pvt. Ltd.(PVC polymers manuf.)
4.Manonmani Oil mills(Groundnut oil manuf.)
5.Pandiyan Cements graphites(hollow block manuf.)
6.Renaissance petro Lubes Ltd.(Oil blending&Bottling)
7. Vino Papers,Plastics and Carborandum manuf.

Etc.. are some industries currently functioning at SIPCOT MANAMADURAI.

Transport

Road

The Manamadurai Bus terminus is situated at Western bank of the town close to Manamadurai - Rameswaram Highway. It is well connected to major cities like Madurai, Trichy, Chennai, and Rameswaram.

Rail

The Manamadurai Junction railway station is situated in southern part of the village at the Western Bank. It is a major stopping for all the trains running between Rameshwaram - Madurai, Rameswaram - Chennai and Virudhunagar - Karaikudi. The railway junction in manamadurai connects with Aruppukottai railway Station in south west,  Madurai railway junction in north west, and "the holy temple city" Rameswaram railway station in south east and Karaikudi railway junction in north east.  The  daily local DEMU Passenger train via Manamadurai connects the main cities of virudhunagar and Tiruchirapalli via  Sivaganga, karaikudi, Chettinad devakkottai road, Thirumayam, Pudukkottai and leads to Trichy.  A local passenger train runs dailybetween Madurai to Rameswaram via Thiruppuvanam, thiruppachethi, Manamadurai, paramakkudi, Ramanathapuram, Mandapam, pamban and leads to Rameshwaram. The railway line between Manamadurai and Rameswaram became the country's first green train corridor. For the past two years Manamadurai to Rameswaram line and Trichy - Virudhunagar lines are being electrified. Minor formalities are under process. Soon it will start its Inaugural run.

Airports

Manamadurai doesn't have its own Airport. Some of the airports near Manamadurai are 

Madurai International Airport (57 kms )

Tiruchirapalli International airport(143 kms.), 

Tuticorin Domestic Airport (160 kms.)

Educational institutions

Colleges
Matha College of Nursing
Matha School of Nursing
Matha College of Arts and Science
Matha Teacher Training Institute
Matha College of Physiotherapy
Matha ITI
Amirtha Nursing College
 Matha College of Teacher Education
 Seikalathur Kamatchi Amman Polytechnic College

Computer institutions
 Apollo Computer Education LTD
 CSC Computer Education LTD, near Ananthavalli Amman Kovil St.
 Sunsoft Computers

Schools
 Baba Matriculation School, 1A, Mettu St.
 Baba Nursery & Primary school, 183-B, Adhanoor Road
 CSI High School for the deaf & dumb, near Gandhi silai
 CSI High School, near Travellers Banglow
 Govt. Elementary school, Burma colony
 Good Will Matriculation School, Bye Pass Road
 Good will matric hr sec school, M. Karisalkulam, Manamadurai
 Govt. Girls Higher Secondary School, near Travellers Banglow, Anbu Nagar
 Kannar Theru Elementary School, Alagar kovil Theru
 Muthu Ameena Muslim (M.A.M) Nursery & Primary School, 113/7, Kannar Street
 O.V.C Elementary School
 O.V.C Higher secondary School,near Old Bus stand
 R.C. St. Cesilia's middle school
 R.C High School
 Ralay Nursery school, Moongiloorani
 St. Mary's higher secondary school, Rajagambiram
 Seventh Day Adventist Matriculation Higher Secondary School, Sipcot
 Suriya Narayana Shastri nursery & Primary School, near Pal Pannai, East Bank(currently not functioning)
 St. Joseph Nursery and primary school, Manamadurai.
 St. Joseph Matric Higher secondary School, Vanpuram, Manamadurai.
 Govt. Higher secondary school,Moongiloorani.
 Govt. Higher secondary school,Melapasalai.

Tourist places
The tourism industry is one of the major revenue generators for Manamadurai. There are various places of interest.

Anandavalli - Somanadhar Temple

 

Arulmigu Somanathar temple is an ancient Shiva temple consorted with Devi Anandavalli, which also houses the Maha Samadhi of the great saint Sadasiva Brahmendra. The temple is located on the west bank of the Vaigai river. This Temple comes under the Control and Maintenance of Sivagangai Samasthan Devasthan Board under the control of Sivagangai's Present Queen.Rani.Medhagu.Sahiba.Gowri vallabha.Sri. Madhuraandhagi Naachiyar.

Thirukalayanam festival is celebrated every year in this temple. The festival resembles the celebration done in Madurai Meenakshi amman temple. But Thirukalyanam will take place in the early morning in Madurai and late evening in Manamadurai.

"Kallazhagar Vaigayil ezhuntharum Nigazhvu"(transl:கள்ளழகர் வைகை ஆற்றில் எழுந்தருளும் நிகழ்வு)
Was better celebrated by People of Manamadurai.

Prithyangira Devi Temple
Panchabhutheswaram, also known as Vedhiyanendal vilakku, 5 km from Manamadurai, is on old ramanathapuram road, the route in which Lord Rama went to Sri Lanka to confront Ravanan. This place is known for its hard cut-rock (granite) temple dedicated to Shri Maha Panchamukha Prathyangira Devi. It houses the big deity of shri Maha Panchamukha Prathyangira Devi. There are two more sannidhies for Lakshmi Ganapathi and Sornagarshna Bhairavar. Kumbhabhishekham was performed on 24 June 2010. Sahasra Sandi Maha Yagnam was also performed from 25 June 2010 to 29 June 2010. Soon within the temple premises, ten more sannidhies are going to come for Dasamaha Vidya. Non-stop annadharmam right from 2000 since inception. Every Amavasai, people were various parts of Tamil Nadu and other states visit the temple.

The Holy Paanch peer (Anjanamar) Five Shuhadaas Dargah
The Holy Paanch peer (Anjanamar) Five Shuhadaas Dargah is located near Kannar street, Manamadurai in Sivaganga District. The Panchpeer durgah is at Kannar road, on the Manamadurai-Ilayangudi State Highway. The Graves of Five Martyrs who came with Badusha Sulthan Syed Ibrahim Shaheed of Ervadi is found here.

See also
 Manamadurai block
 Manamadurai taluk
 Manamadurai Assembly
 Manamadurai Railway Junction
 Madurai
 Vadamadurai

External links
 Google Map link

References

Cities and towns in Sivaganga district
Dargahs in Tamil Nadu
Erwadi-related dargahs
Sufi shrines in India
Ziyarat